Marjorie Burnet Rambeau (July 15, 1889 – July 6, 1970) was an American film and stage actress. She began her stage career at age 12, and appeared in several silent films before debuting in her first sound film, Her Man (1930).  She was twice nominated for the Academy Award for Best Supporting Actress for her roles in Primrose Path (1940) and Torch Song (1953), and received the 1955 National Board of Review Award for Best Supporting Actress for her roles in A Man Called Peter and The View from Pompey's Head.

Early life
Rambeau was born in San Francisco to Marcel and Lilian Garlinda (née Kindelberger) Rambeau. Her parents separated when she was a child. Her mother and she went to Nome, Alaska, where young Marjorie dressed as a boy, sang, and played the banjo in saloons and music halls. Her mother insisted she dress as a boy to thwart amorous attention from drunken grown men in such a wild and woolly outpost as Nome. She began performing on the stage at the age of 12. She attained theatrical experience in a rambling early life as a strolling player. Finally, she made her Broadway debut on March 10, 1913, in a tryout of Willard Mack's play, Kick In.

Career

In her youth, she was a Broadway leading lady, starring in plays such as the 1915 comedy Sadie Love. In 1921, Dorothy Parker memorialized her in verse:

If all the tears you shed so lavishly / Were gathered, as they left each brimming eye. / And were collected in a crystal sea, / The envious ocean would curl up and dry— / So awful in its mightiness, that lake, / So fathomless, that clear and salty deep. / For, oh, it seems your gentle heart must break, /  To see you weep. ...

Her silent films with the Mutual company included Mary Moreland and The Greater Woman (1917). The films were not major successes, but did expose Rambeau to film audiences. By the time talkies came along, she was in her early 40s and began to take on character roles in films such as Min and Bill (1930), The Secret Six (1931) starring Wallace Beery, Jean Harlow and Clark Gable, Laughing Sinners (1931) with Joan Crawford and Clark Gable, Grand Canary (1934) with Warner Baxter and Madge Evans, Palooka (1934) with Jimmy Durante, and Primrose Path (1940) with Ginger Rogers and Joel McCrea, for which she was nominated for the Academy Award for Best Supporting Actress.

Rambeau played a supporting role in Min and Bill (1930) with Marie Dressler and Wallace Beery. Tugboat Annie was a follow-up to Min and Bill, though it was not a sequel. Rambeau replaced Dressler after her death as Tugboat Annie in the sequel Tugboat Annie Sails Again (1940), also starring Alan Hale Sr., Jane Wyman, Ronald Reagan, and Chill Wills.
Also in 1940, she had second billing under Wallace Beery (the co-star of the original Tugboat Annie) in 20 Mule Team; she also played an Italian mother in East of the River with John Garfield and Brenda Marshall. In 1943, she played a supporting role in In Old Oklahoma with John Wayne, Martha Scott, and Gabby Hayes. Her other films included second billing in Tobacco Road (1941) and Broadway (1942) starring George Raft and Pat O'Brien. In 1953, she was again nominated for an Oscar, this time for Torch Song. She appeared in A Man Called Peter with Richard Todd and Jean Peters in 1955. She appeared in a supporting role in Man of a Thousand Faces (1957), a biographical film about the life of Lon Chaney Sr. starring James Cagney as Chaney, although she never worked with the real Chaney in silent films.

For her contribution to the motion picture industry, Rambeau has a star on the Hollywood Walk of Fame at 6336 Hollywood Blvd.

Legacy
Rambeau plays a role in one of the origin stories of the Reuben sandwich. According to author and theatre critic Bernard Sobel, the sandwich was invented for her upon a visit to Reuben's Restaurant and Delicatessen in New York City.

Personal life
Rambeau was descended from colonial immigrant Peter Gunnarsson Rambo, who immigrated in the 1600s from Sweden to New Sweden and served as a justice of the Governor's Council. He was the longest living of the original settlers and became known as the "Father of New Sweden".

Rambeau was married three times, and had no children. She was first married in 1913 to Canadian writer, actor, and director Willard Mack. They divorced in 1917. She then married  actor Hugh Dillman McGaughey in 1919, a marriage which also ended in divorce in 1923. Rambeau's last marriage was to Francis Asbury Gudger in 1931, with whom she remained until his death in 1967. Gudger was from Asheville, North Carolina. In the winter, they often stayed there, and in the summer, they lived in Sebring, Florida. His previous wife was killed in an automobile accident in Tampa two years before, but Rambeau and Gudger had been sweethearts years before when the former was the "toast of Broadway".

Death
Rambeau died in 1970 at her home in Palm Springs, California, and was buried at the Desert Memorial Park in Cathedral City.

Filmography

Silent

Sound

See also

 List of actors with Academy Award nominations

References

External links

 
 
 Marjorie Rambeau photo gallery at NYP Library (the man in the color photos with Marjorie is most likely her third husband Francis Gudger)
 Marjorie Rambeau in film "Mary Moreland" Calgary Herald 3 November 1917
Marjorie Rambeau (Aveleyman)
photo of mother Lillian circa 1920

1889 births
1970 deaths
20th-century American actresses
Actresses from Alaska
Actresses from San Francisco
American film actresses
American silent film actresses
American stage actresses
Burials at Desert Memorial Park